Young Woman Stringing Pearls is a 1658 painting by the Dutch artist Frans van Mieris the Elder. It has been in the collection of the Musée Fabre, in Montpellier, since 1836.

References

Paintings by Frans van Mieris the Elder
Paintings in the collection of the Musée Fabre
1658 paintings
Dutch Golden Age paintings